Members of the New South Wales Legislative Council who served from 1907 to 1910 were appointed for life by the Governor on the advice of the Premier. This list includes members between the election on 10 September 1907 and the election on 14 October 1910. The President was Sir Francis Suttor.

See also
Wade ministry

Notes

References

 

Members of New South Wales parliaments by term
20th-century Australian politicians